Slough is a constituency represented in the House of Commons of the UK Parliament by Tan Dhesi, a member of the Labour Party, since the 2017 UK general election.
Slough had previously been represented since 1997 by Fiona Mactaggart, also of the Labour Party, until she stepped down from politics.

Constituency profile 
The Conservatives gained the new Slough seat in 1983, and held it until 1997, when Labour gained the constituency.

Workless claimants stood at 3.9% in November 2012, just 0.1% above the national average, and while lower than all of eastern Kent and the Isle of Wight, statistically significantly greater than the regional average of 2.5%. The borough has one of the largest mixed commercial (company headquarters and manufacturing) estates in Europe and fast rail links to London on the Great Western Main Line, to be bolstered by direct city centre services with Crossrail.  The area is also the part of the M4 corridor that is the closest to the capital and London Heathrow Airport. The seat has a large Asian population with Hindu, Muslim and Sikh communities, and less than half of the seat's population is White. It has one of the highest proportions of Sikh residents of any seat outside of London and the metropolitan West Midlands at 10%, with its newly elected member, Tanmanjeet Singh Dhesi, becoming Britain's first turbaned Sikh MP in the 2017 general election.

History
From 1945 to 1983 most of the area presently covered by this seat was in the Eton and Slough constituency, which was a marginal seat usually held by the Labour Party.  The Labour MP from 1950 to 1964 was the veteran politician Fenner Brockway, a radical progressive social democrat, who led in writing on pacifism, prison reform, anti-colonialism and anti-discrimination, was editor of the Labour Leader, attended talks by the Fabian Society and had joined the fledgling Independent Labour Party in 1907.

The Slough constituency was created for the 1983 general election from the bulk of the abolished Borough Constituency of Eton and Slough, which contributed 88.2% of the constituency. The remaining northern slice came from the safe Conservative constituency of Beaconsfield.

It currently covers the Borough of Slough, with the exception of the Colnbrook with Poyle ward, which was added to the Windsor constituency after it was created within the Borough of Slough as a result of minor boundary changes involving the counties of Berkshire, Buckinghamshire and Surrey in 1998.

As of the 2017 general election, the seat is one of two Labour seats from a total of eight seats in Berkshire.

Boundaries and boundary changes 

1983–1997: The Borough of Slough.

1997–2010: The Borough of Slough wards of Baylis, Britwell, Central, Chalvey, Cippenham, Farnham, Haymill, Kederminster, Langley St Mary's, Stoke, Upton, and Wexham Lea.

2010–present: The Borough of Slough wards of Baylis and Stoke, Britwell, Central, Chalvey, Cippenham Green, Cippenham Meadows, Farnham, Foxborough, Haymill, Kedermister, Langley St Mary's, Upton, and Wexham Lea.

The Foxborough ward was transferred to Windsor for the 1997 general election, but returned in 2010.

Members of Parliament

Elections

Elections in the 2010s

Elections in the 2000s

Elections in the 1990s

Elections in the 1980s

See also 
 List of parliamentary constituencies in Berkshire
 Slough Borough Council includes historical information about wards and local elections

Notes

References

Sources 
 British Parliamentary Constituencies, A Statistical Compendium, by Ivor Crewe and Anthony Fox (Faber and Faber 1984).
 Official list of candidates nominated 2010 Slough Borough Council website accessed 21 April 2010

External links 
  The Boundary Committee for England page about Slough Unitary Authority, with links to pre and post 2004 ward maps

Parliamentary constituencies in Berkshire
Government and politics of Slough
Constituencies of the Parliament of the United Kingdom established in 1983